Lorcan Dolan is a Gaelic footballer who plays for Castledaly and the Westmeath county team.

He scored a goal against Laois in the 2021 Leinster Senior Football Championship.

He is a former student of Moate CS.

His goal, which put Westmeath into the lead against Cavan in the 2022 Tailteann Cup Final, was the first goal scored in a Tailteann Cup final.

Honours
Westmeath
 Tailteann Cup (1): 2022

References

Year of birth missing (living people)
Living people
Gaelic football forwards
Westmeath inter-county Gaelic footballers